Leuşeni may refer to several places in Moldova:

Leuşeni, Hînceşti, a commune in Hînceşti district
Leuşeni, Teleneşti, a commune in Teleneşti district